The 1869 Vermont gubernatorial election took place on September 7, 1869. Incumbent Republican John B. Page, per the "Mountain Rule", did not run for re-election to another term as Governor of Vermont. Republican candidate Peter T. Washburn, who had served in the Vermont House of Representatives and as Adjutant General of the Vermont Militia, defeated Democratic candidate Homer W. Heaton, a former member of the Vermont House, to succeed him. The 1869 election was the final time the Governor of Vermont was elected for a one-year term; terms were changed to two years beginning in 1870.

Results

References

Vermont
1869
Gubernatorial
September 1869 events